The Rochdale by-election of 13 February 1958 was a by-election for the constituency of Rochdale, in Lancashire, England, in the House of Commons. It was called following the death on 16 December 1957 of the sitting Conservative Member of Parliament, Wentworth Schofield.

This was the first British election to be televised, and Liberal candidate Ludovic Kennedy used his media experience to increase coverage of his campaign.  Granada Television broadcast two debates between the candidates as well as the election count, and the BBC conducted many interviews with voters.

The election was won by the Labour candidate, Jack McCann, with 22,000 votes, but Kennedy polled 17,603, the highest Liberal vote since the 1920s. The Conservative candidate, John Parkinson, was squeezed into third place with fewer than 10,000 votes.

Results

See also 
 1940 Rochdale by-election, an unopposed war-time election
 1972 Rochdale by-election
 Rochdale
 List of United Kingdom by-elections

References

External links
British Parliamentary By Elections: Campaign literature from the by-election

Rochdale by-election
Rochdale by-election
1950s in Lancashire
Rochdale by-election
Elections in the Metropolitan Borough of Rochdale
By-elections to the Parliament of the United Kingdom in Greater Manchester constituencies
By-elections to the Parliament of the United Kingdom in Lancashire constituencies